Abel (KT-12/H1) is the name given to the only specimen ever discovered of Australopithecus bahrelghazali.  Abel was found in January 1995 in Chad in the Kanem Region by the paleontologist Michel Brunet, who named the fossil "Abel" in memory of his close friend Abel Brillanceau, who had died of malaria in 1989.

Of Abel remains only part of a jaw, which explains the little information discernable concerning its way of life.

The few teeth confirm it to be of the genus Australopithecus: it has a second premolar with a broad and molarized crown, not dissimilar to the Lucy fossil, and as such to the Australopithecus afarensis.

See also
List of human evolution fossils

References

Australopithecus fossils
Prehistoric Chad